Z. D. Lewis (1859–1926) was an influential Baptist church leader and the first president of the Southern Aid and Insurance Company based in Richmond, Virginia. It was the oldest African American owned insurance company in the U.S. when it was acquired by another agency in 1977. The company wrote insurance for industrial life, accident and sick benefits insurance and was licensed in New Jersey, Virginia and District of Columbia, and had offices in Alexandria, Bristol, Charlottesville, Danville, Farmville, Fredericksburg, Lynchburg, Newport News, Norfolk, Petersburg, Portsmouth, Richmond, Roanoke, Saluda, Suffolk, Winchester, Virginia; and Washington, D.C. Lewis was politically influential and became involved in leadership disputes within the African American Baptist community of Richmond.

Lewis was pastor of the Second Baptist Church of Richmond. He was chosen by organizers of the insurance company to lead it. In 1898, he delivered what Lucy Coles would describe as a fiery speech opposing her attempt to collect funds for a mission building in Liberia. Coles was a prominent American missionary and the mother of Elizabeth Coles Bouey. Lewis was at the time moderator of the Richmond Minister's Conference.

References

External links

1859 births
1926 deaths
Baptists from Virginia
Religious leaders from Richmond, Virginia
19th-century Baptists